The Victoires de la musique classique are an annual French classical music award event founded in 1986. The awards are the classical equivalent of the popular music awards Victoires de la Musique and the Victoires du Jazz. Most of the awards are for actual performers, orchestras, composers, etc. as opposed to the Diapason d'Or given to recordings, though there is an Enregistrement français de musique classique de l'année.

Categories
For full listing of winners see :fr:Victoires de la musique classique, not every prize is awarded each year:
 Singer of the Year
 Revelation opera singer
 instrumental soloist of the year
 Revelation Instrumental Soloist of the Year
 International Revelation of the Year
 Conductor of the Year
 Chamber Music Ensemble of the year
 Instrumental Ensemble of the Year
 Vocal Ensemble of the Year
 Composer of the Year
 Creation of the year
 Concert of classical music or opera performance of the year
 Representation of the year lyric
 Contribution to International French music of the year
 Production France choreographic year
 Recording of French classical music of the year
 Recording of Opera of the year
 Recording of foreign classical music of the year
 Recording music or baroque old year
 DVD of the year
 Wins Honor

Enregistrement français de musique classique de l'année  
 1986 : Préludes (Debussy) of Claude Debussy played by Alain Planès
 1987 : Intégrale des œuvres pour piano d'Erik Satie played by Aldo Ciccolini and Gabriel Tacchino
 1988 : Prélude à l'après-midi d'un faune of Claude Debussy, L'Apprenti sorcier de Paul Dukas, Pavane pour une défunte of Maurice Ravel and Gymnopédies 1,3 of Erik Satie by the Orchestre national de France dir. Georges Prêtre
 1990 : Carmen of Georges Bizet by  Jessye Norman Chœur de Radio France, Maîtrise de Radio France, Orchestre national de France dir. Seiji Ozawa, 
 1991 : L'Intégrale de l'œuvre pour orchestre de Maurice Ravel Cleveland Orchestra and the New York Philharmonic dir. Pierre Boulez
 1992 : Les Quatuors dédiés à Haydn, tome 1 Mozart by the Quatuor Mosaïques
 1993 : Montezuma of Vivaldi by la Grande Écurie et la Chambre du Roy dir. Jean-Claude Malgoire
 1994 : Dialogue des Carmélites (Poulenc) Catherine Dubosc, Rita Gorr, José van Dam, Orchestre de l'Opéra national de Lyon, dir. Kent Nagano 
 1995 : Éclair sur l'au-delà (Messiaen) by the Orchestra of the Opéra Bastille under Myung-Whun Chung
 1999 : Lakmé (Delibes) interpreted par Natalie Dessay, Gregory Kunde, José Van Dam, Orchestre national du Capitole de Toulouse dir. Michel Plasson
 2002 : Italian Arias (Gluck) by Cecilia Bartoli, Akademie für Alte Musik Berlin 
 2003 : Pelléas et Mélisande (Debussy) by Anne-Sofie von Otter, Wolfgang Holzmair, Laurent Naouri, Orchestre national de France dir. Bernard Haitink
 2004 : Carmen (Bizet) by Angela Gheorghiu, Roberto Alagna, choir Les Éléments, Orchestre national du Capitole de Toulouse dir. Michel Plasson 
 2006 : Génération, Phonal, Feuermann, Ritratto concertante (Jean-Louis Agobet) by Michel Portal, Paul Meyer, Alain Billard, Xavier Phillips, Alexandre Paley, Orchestre philharmonique de Strasbourg, dir. François-Xavier Roth
 2008 : Carestini, histoire d'un castrat, recital Philippe Jaroussky, Le Concert d'Astrée, dir. Emmanuelle Haïm
 2009 : Lamenti, recital Natalie Dessay, Rolando Villazón, Joyce DiDonato, Patrizia Ciofi, Philippe Jaroussky, Laurent Naouri, Marie-Nicole Lemieux, Véronique Gens, Christopher Purves, Topi Lehtipuu, Simon Wall and Le Concert d'Astrée, dir. Emmanuelle Haïm
 2011 : Les concertos pour piano de Ravel, Pierre-Laurent Aimard, Cleveland Orchestra, dir. Pierre Boulez
 2012 : Les Années de pèlerinage Franz Liszt played by Bertrand Chamayou
 2013 : Le boeuf sur le Toit by Alexandre Tharaud
 2014 : Correspondances Henri Dutilleux with Barbara Hannigan and Orchestre philharmonique de Radio France, conducted Esa-Pekka Salonen (Deutsche Grammophon)
 2015 : Köthener Trauermusik BWV 244a Johann Sebastian Bach, Ensemble Pygmalion, dir. Raphaël Pichon (Harmonia Mundi).

References

Classical music awards
French music awards